The Polish United Workers' Party, commonly abbreviated to PZPR, was the communist party which ruled the Polish People's Republic as a one-party state from 1948 to 1989. The PZPR had led two other legally permitted subordinate minor parties together as the Front of National Unity and later Patriotic Movement for National Rebirth. Ideologically, it was based on the theories of Marxism-Leninism, with a strong emphasis on left-wing nationalism. The Polish United Workers' Party had total control over public institutions in the country as well as the Polish People's Army, the UB-SB security agencies, the Citizens' Militia (MO) police force and the media.

The falsified 1947 Polish legislative election granted the far-left complete political authority in post-war Poland. The PZPR was founded forthwith in December 1948 through the unification of two previous political entities, the Polish Workers' Party (PPR) and the Polish Socialist Party (PPS). Since 1952, the position of "First Secretary" of the Polish United Workers' Party was equivalent to that of a dictator, the president or the head of state in other world countries. Throughout its existence, the PZPR maintained close ties with ideologically-similar parties of the Eastern Bloc, most notably the Socialist Unity Party of Germany, Communist Party of Czechoslovakia and the Communist Party of the Soviet Union. Between 1948 and 1954, nearly 1.5 million individuals registered as Polish United Workers' Party members, and membership rose to 3 million by 1980.

The party's primary objective was to impose socialist agenda into Polish society. The communist government sought to improve the living standards of the proletariat, make education and healthcare available to all, establish a centralized planned economy, nationalize all institutions and provide internal or external security by up-keeping a strong-armed force. Some concepts imported from abroad, such as large-scale collective farming and secularization, failed in their early stages. The PZPR was considered more liberal and pro-Western than its counterparts in East Germany or the Soviet Union, and was more averse to radical politics. Although propaganda was utilized in major media outlets like Trybuna Ludu ("People's Tribune") and televised Dziennik ("Journal"), censorship became ineffective by the mid-1980s and was gradually abolished. On the other hand, the Polish United Worker's Party was responsible for the brutal pacification of civil resistance and protesters in the Poznań protests of 1956, the 1970 Polish protests and throughout martial law between 1981 and 1983. The PZPR also initiated a bitter anti-Semitic campaign during the 1968 Polish political crisis, which forced the remainder of Poland's Jews to emigrate.

Amidst the ongoing political and economic crises, the Solidarity movement emerged as a major anti-bureaucratic social movement that pursued social change. With communist rule being relaxed in neighbouring countries, the PZPR systematically lost support and was forced to negotiate with the opposition and adhere to the Polish Round Table Agreement, which permitted free democratic elections. The elections on 4 June 1989 proved victorious for Solidarity, thus bringing 40-year communist rule in Poland to an end. The Polish United Workers' Party was dissolved in January 1990.

Programme and goals 

Until 1989, the PZPR held dictatorial powers (the amendment to the constitution of 1976 mentioned "a leading national force") and controlled an unwieldy bureaucracy, the military, the secret police, and the economy.
Its main goal was to create a Communist society and help to propagate Communism all over the world. On paper, the party was organised on the basis of democratic centralism, which assumed a democratic appointment of authorities, making decisions, and managing its activity. These authorities decided about the policy and composition of the main organs; although, according to the statute, it was a responsibility of the members of the congress, which was held every five or six years. Between sessions, the regional, county, district and work committees held party conferences. The smallest organizational unit of the PZPR was the Fundamental Party Organization (FPO), which functioned in workplaces, schools, cultural institutions, etc.

The main part in the PZPR was played by professional politicians, or the so-called "party's hardcore", formed by people who were recommended to manage the main state institutions, social organizations, and trade unions. The crowning time of the PZPR development (the end of the 1970s) consisted of over 3.5 million members. The Political Office of the Central Committee, Secretariat and regional committees appointed the key posts within the party and in all organizations having ‘state’ in its name – from central offices to even small state and cooperative companies. It was called the nomenklatura system of state and economy management. In certain areas of the economy, e.g., in agriculture, the nomenklatura system was controlled with the approval of the PZPR and by its allied parties, the United People's Party (agriculture and food production), and the Democratic Party (trade community, small enterprise, some cooperatives). After martial law began, the Patriotic Movement for National Rebirth was founded to organize these and other parties.

History

Establishment and Sovietization period 

The Polish United Workers' Party was established at the unification congress of the Polish Workers' Party and Polish Socialist Party during meetings held at the main building of Politechnika Warszawska (Warsaw University of Technology) from 15 to 21 December 1948. The unification was possible because the PPS activists who opposed unification (or rather absorption into the Workers' Party) had been forced out of the party. Similarly, the members of the PPR who were accused of "rightist–nationalist deviation" were expelled. Thus, the PZPR was a renamed and enlarged PPR for all intents and purposes.

"Rightist-nationalist deviation" was a political propaganda term used by the Polish Stalinists against prominent activists, such as Władysław Gomułka and Marian Spychalski who opposed Soviet involvement in the Polish internal affairs, as well as internationalism displayed by the creation of the Cominform and the subsequent merger that created the PZPR. It is believed that it was Joseph Stalin who put pressure on Bolesław Bierut and Jakub Berman to remove Gomułka and Spychalski as well as their followers from power in 1948. It is estimated that over 25% of socialists were removed from power or expelled from political life.

Bolesław Bierut, an NKVD agent and a hardline Stalinist, served as first Secretary General of the ruling PZPR from 1948 to 1956, playing a leading role in imposing communism and the installation of its repressive regime. He had served as President since 1944 (though on a provisional basis until 1947). After a new constitution abolished the presidency, Bierut took over as Prime Minister, a post he held until 1954. He remained party leader until his death in 1956.

Bierut oversaw the trials of many Polish wartime military leaders, such as General Stanisław Tatar and Brig. General Emil August Fieldorf, as well as 40 members of the Wolność i Niezawisłość (Freedom and Independence) organisation, various Church officials and many other opponents of the new regime including Witold Pilecki, condemned to death during secret trials. Bierut signed many of those death sentences.

Bierut's mysterious death in Moscow in 1956 (shortly after attending the 20th Congress of the Communist Party of the Soviet Union) gave rise to much speculation about poisoning or a suicide, and symbolically marked the end of Stalinism era in Poland.

Gomułka's autarchic communism 

In 1956, shortly after the 20th Congress of the Communist Party of the Soviet Union, the PZPR leadership split into two factions, dubbed Natolinians and Puławians. The Natolin faction – named after the place where its meetings took place, in a government villa in Natolin – were against the post-Stalinist liberalization programs (Gomułka thaw). The most well known members included Franciszek Jóźwiak, Wiktor Kłosiewicz, Zenon Nowak, Aleksander Zawadzki, Władysław Dworakowski, Hilary Chełchowski.

The Puławian faction – the name comes from the Puławska Street in Warsaw, on which many of the members lived – sought great liberalization of socialism in Poland. After the events of Poznań June, they successfully backed the candidature of Władysław Gomułka for First Secretary of party, thus imposing a major setback upon Natolinians. Among the most prominent members were Roman Zambrowski and Leon Kasman. Both factions disappeared towards the end of the 1950s.

Initially very popular for his reforms and seeking a "Polish way to socialism", and beginning an era known as Gomułka's thaw, he came under Soviet pressure. In the 1960s he supported persecution of the Roman Catholic Church and intellectuals (notably Leszek Kołakowski who was forced into exile). He participated in the Warsaw Pact intervention in Czechoslovakia in 1968. At that time he was also responsible for persecuting students as well as toughening censorship of the media. In 1968, he incited an anti-Zionist propaganda campaign, as a result of Soviet bloc opposition to the Six-Day War.

In December 1970, a bloody clash with shipyard workers in which several dozen workers were fatally shot forced his resignation (officially for health reasons; he had in fact suffered a stroke). A dynamic younger man, Edward Gierek, took over the Party leadership and tensions eased.

Gierek's economic opening 

In the late 1960s, Edward Gierek had created a personal power base and become the recognized leader of the young technocrat faction of the party. When rioting over economic conditions broke out in late 1970, Gierek replaced Gomułka as party first secretary. Gierek promised economic reform and instituted a program to modernize industry and increase the availability of consumer goods, doing so mostly through foreign loans. His good relations with Western politicians, especially France's Valéry Giscard d'Estaing and West Germany's Helmut Schmidt, were a catalyst for his receiving western aid and loans.

The standard of living improved in Poland in the 1970s, the economy, however, began to falter during the 1973 oil crisis, and by 1976 price hikes became necessary. New riots broke out in June 1976, and although they were forcibly suppressed, the planned price increases were suspended. High foreign debts, food shortages, and an outmoded industrial base compelled a new round of economic reforms in 1980. Once again, price increases set off protests across the country, especially in the Gdańsk and Szczecin shipyards. Gierek was forced to grant legal status to Solidarity and to concede the right to strike. (Gdańsk Agreement).

Shortly thereafter, in early September 1980, Gierek was replaced by Stanisław Kania as General Secretary of the party by the Central Committee, amidst much social and economic unrest.
Kania admitted that the party had made many economic mistakes, and advocated working with Catholic and trade unionist opposition groups. He met with Solidarity leader Lech Wałęsa, and other critics of the party. Though Kania agreed with his predecessors that the Communist Party must maintain control of Poland, he never assured the Soviets that Poland would not pursue actions independent of the Soviet Union. On 18 October 1981, the Central Committee of the Party withdrew confidence in him, and Kania was replaced by Prime Minister (and Minister of Defence) Gen. Wojciech Jaruzelski.

Jaruzelski's autocratic rule 

On 11 February 1981, Jaruzelski was elected Prime Minister of Poland and became the first secretary of the Polish United Workers' Party on 18 October 1981. Before initiating the plan of suppressing Solidarity, he presented it to Soviet Premier Nikolai Tikhonov. On 13 December 1981, Jaruzelski imposed martial law in Poland.

In 1982, Jaruzelski revitalized the Front of National Unity, the organization the Communists used to manage their satellite parties, as the Patriotic Movement for National Rebirth.

In 1985, Jaruzelski resigned as prime minister and defence minister and became chairman of the Polish Council of State, a post equivalent to that of president or a dictator, with his power centered on and firmly entrenched in his coterie of "LWP" generals and lower ranks officers of the Polish People's Army.

Breakdown of autocracy 
The attempt to impose a naked military dictatorship, notwithstanding, the policies of Mikhail Gorbachev stimulated political reform in Poland. By the close of the tenth plenary session in December 1988, the Polish United Workers Party was forced, after strikes, to approach leaders of Solidarity for talks.

From 6 February to 15 April 1989, negotiations were held between 13 working groups during 94 sessions of the roundtable talks.

These negotiations resulted in an agreement that stated that a great degree of political power would be given to a newly created bicameral legislature.  It also created a new post of president to act as head of state and chief executive.  Solidarity was also declared a legal organization. During the following Polish elections the Communists won 65 percent of the seats in the Sejm, though the seats won were guaranteed and the Communists were unable to gain a majority, while 99 out of the 100 seats in the Senate — all freely contested — were won by Solidarity-backed candidates. Jaruzelski won the presidential ballot by one vote.

Jaruzelski was unsuccessful in convincing Wałęsa to include Solidarity in a "grand coalition" with the Communists and resigned his position of general secretary of the Polish United Workers Party. The PZPR' two allied parties broke their long-standing alliance, forcing Jaruzelski to appoint Solidarity's Tadeusz Mazowiecki as the country's first non-communist prime minister since 1948.  Jaruzelski resigned as Poland's President in 1990, being succeeded by Wałęsa in December.

Dissolution of the PZPR 

Starting from January 1990, the collapse of the PZPR became inevitable. All over the country, public occupations of the party buildings started in order to prevent stealing the party's possessions and destroying or taking the archives. On 29 January 1990, XI Congress was held, which was supposed to recreate the party. Finally, the PZPR dissolved, and some of its members decided to establish two new social-democratic parties. They got over $1 million from the Communist Party of the Soviet Union known as the Moscow loan.

The former activists of the PZPR established the Social Democracy of the Republic of Poland (in Polish: Socjaldemokracja Rzeczpospolitej Polskiej, SdRP), of which the main organizers were Leszek Miller and Mieczysław Rakowski. The SdRP was supposed (among other things) to take over all rights and duties of the PZPR, and help to divide out the property. Up to the end of the 1980s, it had considerable incomes mainly from managed properties and from the RSW company ‘Press- Book-Traffic’, which in turn had special tax concessions. During this period, the income from membership fees constituted only 30% of the PZPR's revenues. After the dissolution of the Polish United Workers' Party and the establishment of the SdRP, the rest of the activists formed the Social Democratic Union of the Republic of Poland (USdRP), which changed its name to the Polish Social Democratic Union, and The 8th July Movement.

At the end of 1990, there was an intense debate in the Sejm on the takeover of the wealth that belonged to the former PZPR. Over 3000 buildings and premises were included in the wealth and almost half of it was used without legal basis. Supporters of the acquisition argued that the wealth was built on the basis of plunder and the Treasury grant collected by the whole society. Opponents of SdRP claimed that the wealth was created from membership fees; therefore, they demanded wealth inheritance for SdPR which at that time administered the wealth. Personal property and the accounts of the former PZPR were not subject to control of a parliamentary committee.

On 9 November 1990, the Sejm passed "The resolution about the acquisition of the wealth that belonged to the former PZPR". This resolution was supposed to result in a final takeover of the PZPR real estate by the Treasury. As a result, only a part of the real estate was taken over mainly for a local government by 1992, whereas a legal dispute over the other party carried on till 2000. Personal property and finances of the former PZPR practically disappeared. According to the declaration of SdRP Members of Parliament, 90–95% of the party's wealth was allocated for gratuity or was donated for social assistance.

Structure
The highest statutory authority of the Voivodeship party organization was the voivodeship conference, and in the period between conferences – the PZPR voivodeship committee. To drive current party work, the provincial committee chose the executive. Voivodeship conferences convened a provincial committee in consultation with the Central Committee of PZPR – formally at least once in year. Plenary meetings of the Voivodeship committee were to be convened at least every two months and executive meetings – once a week.

In practice, the frequency of holding provincial conferences and plenary meetings KW deviated from the statutory standards were held less often. Dates and basic Topics of session of Voivodeship party conferences and plenary sessions of Voivodeship Committee PZPR in the provinces of Poland were generally correlated with dates and topics of plenary sessions Central Committee of the PZPR. They were devoted mainly to "transferring" resolutions and decisions of the Central Committee to the provincial party organization. The provincial committee had no freedom in shaping the original, its own meeting plan. The initiative could be demonstrated – in accordance with the principle of democratic centralism – only in the implementation of resolutions and orders of instances supreme.

The dependence of the Voivodeship party organization and its authorities was also determined by that its activity was financed almost entirely from a subsidy received from the Central Committee of PZPR. Membership fees constituted no more than 10% of revenues. The activities of the Voivodeship Committee between PZPR Voivodeship conferences were formally controlled by the Audit Committee (elected during these conferences). Initially only examined the budget implementation and accounting of PZPR Voivodeship Committee. In the following years, the scope of its activities was expanded, including control over the management of party membership cards, security OF confidential documents, how to deal with complaints and complaints addressed to the party. The number of inspections carried out grew systematically, and the work of committees accepted more planned and formalized character.

Building
The Central Committee had its seat in the Party's House, a building erected by obligatory subscription from 1948 to 1952 and colloquially called White House or the House of Sheep. Since 1991 the Bank-Financial Center "New World" is located in this building. From 1991–2000 the Warsaw Stock Exchange also had its seat there.

Party leaders

By the year 1954 the head of the party was the Chair of Central Committee:

Leading figures

Notable politicians after 1989

Presidents
 Wojciech Jaruzelski
 Aleksander Kwaśniewski

Prime ministers
 Józef Oleksy
 Włodzimierz Cimoszewicz
 Leszek Miller
 Marek Belka

European Commissioners
 Danuta Hübner

Electoral history

Sejm elections

See also
Politburo of the Polish United Workers' Party
List of Polish United Workers' Party members
Eastern Bloc politics
Communist Party of Poland (1918 – 1938 y.)
Polish Communist Party (2002) – receiver with 2002 year

References

External links
MSWiA – Sprawozdanie z likwidacji majątku byłej PZPR  (MSWiA – The report on the liquidation of property of the former PZPR) 

 
Eastern Bloc
Parties of one-party systems
1948 establishments in Poland
1990 disestablishments in Poland